The Midlands Junior League is an age group rugby league development competition for clubs in the English Midlands. It is run by the Midlands Rugby League.

Many of the teams taking part also run open-age sides in the Rugby League Conference or Midlands Rugby League.

History

The adult Midlands Merit League was founded in late 2005 to support the growth of rugby league in non-heartland areas. The 2007 season saw the introduction of an informal under-15 league Midlands Junior League based on Merit League principles. In 2008 the junior competition featured under-14 and under-16 divisions.

The adult Midlands Merit League later evolved into the Midlands Rugby League and the RL Merit League (for clubs in the North of England).

Midlands clubs voted against clubs outside the Midlands being included for the 2010 season. In 2010 the Under-12s took a tournament based format and Under-11s and Girls Under-12s started on a similar basis.

2011 saw the addition of an Under-18s league and saw the Under-14s take on a tournament based format, with the Under-12s replaced by an Under-13s.

In 2023, the Midlands Junior League continued its development. 4 regional festivals at U7-U16 age groups were planned for the summer of 2023, with a host of friendly fixtures arranged between clubs also.

Participating clubs

The following teams will participate in 2023:

Format

Teams play an equal number of games. The top four teams in each age group will contest the semi-finals with first playing fourth and second playing third.

Win: 3 points

Draw: 2 points

Defeat not conceded, fielding 13 players: 1 point

Default on game within three days of fixture: 0 points, with 40-0 score-line awarded to the opposition.

The under-14, under-13 and under-11 boys and under-12 girls competitions take place on a tournament format.

Past winners

 2007 Under-15s: Telford Raiders
 2008 Under-14s: Derby Dragons, Under-16s: Northampton Knights
 2009 Under-12s: Northampton Knights, Under-14s: Redditch Ravens, Under-16s: Nottingham Outlaws
 2010 Under-12s: Northampton Knights, Under-14s: Telford Raiders, Under-16s: Birmingham Bulldogs
 2011 Under-16s: Coventry Bears, Under-18s: Northampton Demons
 2012 Under-16s: Gloucestershire All Golds, Under-18s: Leicester Storm

See also

 Junior rugby league in England

External links
Midlands rugby league site
Rugby League Conference official site

Rugby League Conference
Junior rugby league
Children's sport in the United Kingdom